Crime in the State of Palestine is present in various forms which include theft, drug trafficking, arms trafficking, burglary, human trafficking and terrorism.

Prisons and prison population

Active prisons in Palestine

Between 2010 and 2013, Netherlands funded the Strengthening the Management of the Palestinian Penitentiary System and the Rehabilitation of Inmates in Civil Prisons Administered by the Palestinian Authority program involving the  Palestinian Ministry of Interior, Palestinian Civil Police and Correction and Rehabilitation Centers Directorate (CRCD).

The following prisons are operated by the Palestinian Ministry of Interior and Palestinian Civil Police:
Jneid Prison (Northern West Bank)
Jericho Prison

Active prisons in Gaza

As of 2012, there were 5 prisons in the Hamas-ruled Gaza Strip, housing some 1,200 inmates. Gaza City central prison is housing drug smugglers and drug users. The punishment for smoking hashish in the Gaza Strip is one year in prison, followed by execution, where civilians are executed by hanging and members of armed forces executed by firing squad. The prisons are run by Ministry of the Hamas government in Gaza.

The Reform and Rehabilitation Centre for Women is the only female prison in Gaza. It houses a population of 19-50 women, babies and toddlers. Inmates had to be moved amidst harsh conditions to different locations during 2012 and 2014 conflicts in order to stay safe. At the end of 2016, the inmates were moved to a newer and bigger facility in the same complex.

Crimes by type

Human trafficking

Prostitution in the State of Palestine is illegal, under Palestinian law. Ramallah has prostitution, but long-term abstinence is common, as premarital sex is seen as taboo in the territories.

A 2009 report by the UN Development Fund for Women (UNIFEM) and SAWA-All the Women Together Today and Tomorrow, a Palestinian NGO, suggested that an increasing number of women turned to prostitution in the face of poverty and violence.

Violence against women
The Death of Israa Ghrayeb took place on 22 August 2019 in the Palestinian city of Bethlehem. Israa Ghrayeb, 21 years old, was reportedly beaten to death in an "honor killing" because she posted a selfie with her fiancé a day before they were supposed to get engaged. Her family has denied the accusation, saying that instead she died of a heart attack.

Honor killing

According to UNICEF estimates in 1999, two-thirds of all murders in the Palestinian territories were likely honor killings.

Torture by Palestinian security

Torture in the State of Palestine refers to the use of torture and systematic degrading practices on Palestinians detained by Palestinian forces in the West Bank and the Gaza Strip.

Crimes in Israel by Palestinians

Property crimes by Palestinians
Director of the Latin American Institute of the American Jewish Committee in Washington, D.C. Dina Siegel, criminology professor H. G. van de Bunt, and lecturer in criminology Damián Zaitch showed in their book Global Organized Crime  that a significant amount of crime in Israel, especially property crime, is committed by the residents of the Palestinian National Authority (PNA or PA).

Motor vehicle theft
Motor vehicle theft is a major crime committed by Palestinians. Since the early 1990s, there has been an increase in the rate of robberies in Israel. Between 1994 and 2001, the rate of robberies increased from 14.0 to 30.6 cases per 100,000 population. The reason behind this increase in robberies is analyzed as a result of the establishment of the Palestinian Authority in the West Bank and Gaza Strip which according to the book Global Organized Crime "serves as a safe haven for Palestinian offenders". However, the organized crime industry associated with motor vehicle theft involves not only Palestinians, but also Israeli citizens, both Jewish and Arab. The parts of the stolen cars are removed in "chop shops" in the Palestinian territories and then these vehicles are sold in the black market in Israel. Media reports suggest some of these vehicles are even handed over to high-ranking Palestinian Authority officials. It was reported that since the beginning of 2010 through the end of February 2010, the Palestinian Authority police had destroyed 910 stolen cars.

Although Palestinian criminals are involved in organized crime in the country, Siegel et al. suggested one should not conclude that "organized crime in Israel is dominated by Palestinians. Organized crime committed by Jews or other non-Palestinians has been part of the Israeli crime scene for many years".

Arms trafficking by Palestinians
Arms trafficking is another form of crime and it is directly associated with terrorism. There are many links between Israeli and Palestinian gangsters that facilitate these ventures.

Crimes in Palestine by Israelis

According to Palestinian officials, between 2005 and 2015, there were 11,000 attacks on Palestinians by Jews in the West Bank and in east Jerusalem, including price tag attacks. Between 2010 and 2015, three Palestinians were killed in arson attacks. Arson attacks on property were reported for 15 individual houses, 20 mosques and 4 churches.

See also

Palestinian terrorism

References

 
Islam and violence